Hotel Oslo is the soundtrack of the Norwegian movie of the same name.

The album is written and performed by Magne Furuholmen,  Freddie Wadling , Kjetil Bjerkestrand.
Other artists who collaborated are: Anneli Drecker (singer on We'll Never Speak Again), Per Lindvall (drums), Eivind Aarset (guitar), Jonny Sjo (bass), Bjorg Vaernes (cello), Henninge Batnes (viola).

Track listing

References

External links 
 

Pop albums by Norwegian artists
Film soundtracks
1997 soundtrack albums